Herbert Linge (born 11 June 1928, in Weissach) is a German former racing and rally driver. As an employee of Porsche, he was involved in many events, and later also in motorsport safety.

He took part in many 24 Hours of Le Mans races in the 1960s, even with a Porsche 917. He became famous for being the co-driver of Hans Herrmann in the 1954 Mille Miglia, when their low Porsche 550 passed under a closed railroad crossing, with both ducking under the dashboard. In 1960, Linge won the Tour de Corse rally in a Porsche SC 90. He is still the only German to win the event.

The Deutscher Motor Sport Bund's DMSB-Staffel, founded in 1972 by Linge for the Oberste Nationale Sportbehörde as ONS-Staffel, is considered the first mobile track Marshalling crew, equipped with fast cars like the Porsche 914 or Porsche 911, carrying fire extinguishers and doctors in order to arrive quickly at a crash site.

References

External link

Auto racing executives
German racing drivers
German rally drivers
German motorsport people 
24 Hours of Le Mans drivers
Living people
1928 births
People from Böblingen (district)
Sportspeople from Stuttgart (region)
Racing drivers from Baden-Württemberg
World Sportscar Championship drivers
Recipients of the Cross of the Order of Merit of the Federal Republic of Germany

Carrera Panamericana drivers
Porsche Motorsports drivers